Hydroxyacylglutathione hydrolase, mitochondrial is an enzyme that in humans is encoded by the HAGH gene.

The enzyme encoded by this gene is classified as a thiolesterase and is responsible for the hydrolysis of S-lactoyl-glutathione to reduced glutathione and D-lactate.

References

Further reading